Rödelsee is a municipality in the district of Kitzingen, Lower Franconia, Bavaria, Germany. It's placed near the Schwanberg and is famous for growing wine.

Famous residents
 Paulus Aemilius (c. 1510 - 1575), Hebrew bibliographer and teacher, born in Rödelsee

References

Kitzingen (district)